Thagas is a village in Gilgit Baltistan, Pakistan located  from Khaplu in east. It is on the bank of the Saltoro River just before it joins the Shyok River. Thagas is the administrative headquarters of Mashabrum subdivision of Ghanche District.

History and tradition 
Thagas is on the way from the centres of Baltistan, such as Skardu and Khaplu, to the Saltoro Pass, which was a traditional trade route to Kashgar.  A mosque traditionally attributed to Shah-e-Hamadan is found at Thagas, which is said to have built by him while on his way to Kashgar.

References 

Baltistan
Populated places in Ghanche District